Grotte du Bichon is a karstic cave in the Swiss Jura, overlooking the river Doubs at an altitude of 846 m, some 5 km north of La Chaux-de-Fonds. It is the site of the discovery of the skeleton a  hunter-gatherer of the Azilian (late Upper Paleolithic to early Mesolithic), dubbed "Bichon man" (homme de Bichon), a young male about 20 to 23 years old, carbon dated to 13,770–13,560 years ago (95% CI). The skeleton was discovered in 1956, about 15 m from the cave entrance, intermingled with the bones of a female brown bear, nine flint arrowheads and traces of charcoal. In 1991, flint chips were found embedded in the bear's third vertebra, without indication of healing, suggesting the interpretation that the bear was wounded by arrows, retreated into the cave, and was pursued by the hunter, who made a fire to fumigate the bear from the cave, but was killed by the dying animal.

A genetic analysis of the man showed membership in the "West European Hunter-Gatherer" lineage known from younger fossils of the European Mesolithic. He was a bearer of Y-DNA haplogroup I2a and of mt-DNA haplogroup U5b1h. Y-DNA haplogroup I2a probably arose in Europe prior to the Last Glacial Maximum. Morphologically, his skull was described as relatively long, with a low face and subrectangular eye-sockets. He was relatively slender, but muscular (based on muscle attachments visible on the skeleton), with a pronounced lateral asymmetry suggesting right-handedness. Study of carbon and nitrogen fractionations suggests a largely meat-based diet.

References

Caves of Switzerland
Upper Paleolithic Homo sapiens fossils
Mesolithic Homo sapiens fossils
Magdalenian
La Chaux-de-Fonds